Manwath is a town with municipal council in Parbhani district in the Indian state of Maharashtra.

Demographics 
 India census, Manwath has population of 32,488 of which 16,522 are males while 15,966 are females. Female Sex Ratio is of 966 higher than Maharashtra state average of 929. 13.73% of the population is under 6 years of age.

Literacy rate of Manwath city is 78.07% lower than state average of 82.34%. In Manwath, Male literacy is around 86.10% while female literacy rate is 69.89%.

Schedule Caste (SC) constitutes 9.21% while Schedule Tribe (ST) were 1.64% of total population in Manwath.

Transport 
There are two forms of government transport in Manwath,
 Railway.
 State Transport Buses.
There is a railway station named Manwath Road railway station, which is 7 km from the city. The national highway 61 also runs from the city.  It is about 37 km from Parbhani. There is also a bus stand in the city. 
Indian tours and travels booking office near bus stop Manwath.

Politics

Education  
  
 K.K.M.college 
 Z.P. School.
 Industrial Training Institute 
 Netaji Subash Vidyalaya.
 Srimati Shakuntalabai Kanchanrao Katruwar Vidyalaya
 Shrimati saraswati bai bhale patil vidyalaya.
 Kasturba Gandhi Vidyalaya
 Model English school)
 Sara
 Kasturba Gandhi Vidyalaya
 abdul kalam Urdu primary school (bangala) al-fateh
 iqra Urdu school, galib nagar.(al-qureshswati Primary English School.
 Little Flower English School.

References 

Talukas in Maharashtra
Cities and towns in Parbhani district